The Korea Medical Association is a trade union in South Korea.  It claims to represent about two-thirds of the country's doctors.

In June 2000, the Association organised an indefinite strike in protest of government health reforms. On March 10, 2014 it organised a one-day strike in opposition to the government's plans to introduce telemedicine and against medical regulations they claimed infringed upon physicians' professional autonomy. In August 2020, in the midst of the COVID-19 pandemic with its cases increasing in Korea, the Association organised an 3-day strike and its Korean Intern and Resident Association indefinite strike in protest of government' plan to increase the number of doctors over the next decade rejecting the government's return-to-work order.

The Association publishes the Journal of the Korea Medical Association. Volume 60 was published in March 2017.

A report by the Association's Research Institute for Healthcare Policy in 2022 found that 6,095 medical doctors were charged with professional negligence resulting in death or injury between 2011 and 2018 - far more than in other countries.

References

Trade unions in South Korea
Healthcare trade unions
Medical and health organizations based in South Korea